Gunnar Karlsson (September 26, 1939 in Efstadal í Laugardal, † October 28, 2019 in Reykjavík) was an Icelandic historian. Gunnar shaped methodological teaching at the University of Iceland when he started working there in the seventies and wrote a number of textbooks in history for all school levels as well as other publications.

Life and works  
Gunnar Karlsson studied history at Háskóli Íslands, the University of Iceland. He completed his studies in 1970 and received his doctorate there in 1978. From 1974 to 1976 he taught at University College London, and after 1976 at Háskóli Íslands, where he was appointed professor in 1980.

Gunnar Karlsson contributed mainly to medieval Icelandic history, but also presented comprehensive accounts of Icelandic history in English.

Personal life 
Gunnar was married to Silja Aðalsteinsdóttir, and they had 3 children.

Works (selection) 
 (as editor): Grágás. Lagasafn íslenska þjóðveldisins. Reykjavík: Mál og menning, 1992, . 
 Iceland's 1100 years: The History of a Marginal Society. London: Hurst, 2000, . Reprinted in North America as: The History of Iceland. Minneapolis: University of Minnesota Press, 2000.  
 Handbók í íslenskri miðaldasögu. 3 vols. Reykjavík: Háskólaútgáfan, 2007–2016,  (vol. 1),  (vol. 2),  (vol. 3).  
 A Brief History of Iceland, Reykjavík 2010, .  
 The Settlement of Iceland. A Story from the Ninth and Tenth Centuries. Reykjavík: Mál og menning, 2019, .

References

External links
 Works of Gunnar Karlssonar at the Vísindavefnum (in Icelandic)
 Andlát: Gunnar Karlsson (Obituary from the Morgunblaðið 10.29.2019 (in Icelandic))  
 Gunnar Karlsson látinn (Obituary from RÚV 10.29.2019 (in Icelandic))

Academic staff of the University of Iceland
Icelandic historians
1939 births
2019 deaths